The Bupa Great Capital Run was a  road race and fun run through the paths of Hyde Park, London (and later Regent's Park) which was established in 2007. It was one of the Great Run race series.

The event started in 2007 as a 10k race in Hyde Park, sponsored by Bupa. This format continued in 2008 with a new event for 8-to-14-year-olds, a  run allowing children to run in fancy dress.

In 2009, the main race was reduced to 5k and moved to Regent's Park. This was the final Great Capital Run.

Winners

Sponsors and Partners

 Help A London Child
Capital 95.8
Lucozade Sport
 Aqua Pura

References

External links
Official Site
Great Run
BBC London Sport Great Capital Run 2007

Athletics competitions in England
Recurring sporting events established in 2007
2007 establishments in England
Annual sporting events in the United Kingdom
Annual events in London
Hyde Park, London
Regent's Park